Fusiturris undatiruga, common name the wrinkled turrid, is a species of sea snail, a marine gastropod mollusk in the family Fusiturridae.

Description
The size of an adult shell varies between 20 mm and 65 mm. The diameter is 16 mm. The whorls are angulated in the middle and nodulous on the angle. Above it the surface is smooth, below the nodules are continued as flexuose wrinkles or ribs, becoming evanescent towards the base of the aperture. The color of the shell is yellowish brown, with usually one or two darker bands.

Distribution
This species occurs in the Mediterranean Sea and in the Atlantic Ocean off the Canaries, Gabon and Angola.

References

External links

Bibliography

 Gofas, S.; Afonso, J.P.; Brandào, M. (Ed.). (S.a.). Conchas e Moluscos de Angola = Coquillages et Mollusques d'Angola. [Shells and molluscs of Angola]. Universidade Agostinho / Elf Aquitaine Angola: Angola. 140 pp.
 Bernard, P.A. (Ed.) (1984). Coquillages du Gabon [Shells of Gabon]. Pierre A. Bernard: Libreville, Gabon. 140, 75 plates pp.
 Gofas, S.; Le Renard, J.; Bouchet, P. (2001). Mollusca, in: Costello, M.J. et al. (Ed.) (2001). European register of marine species: a check-list of the marine species in Europe and a bibliography of guides to their identification. Collection Patrimoines Naturels, 50: pp. 180–213

undatiruga
Gastropods described in 1838